The Directorate of Higher Secondary Education is the regulatory body of higher secondary schools in Kerala. It was formed in 1990 to reorganize secondary and collegiate education in the Indian state of Kerala.  The board provides Higher Secondary Examination and offers courses in science, humanities and commerce.

See also
Department of General and Higher Education (Kerala)
Education in Kerala
List of institutions of higher education in Kerala
SSLC

References

External links

Education Department, Government of Kerala
Department of General Education, Government of Kerala
Directorate of Higher Secondary Education, Government of Kerala
Kerala Examination Results

Education in Kerala
School examinations in India
Secondary school qualifications
State secondary education boards of India
High schools and secondary schools in Kerala
Government agencies established in 1990
1990 establishments in Kerala